Sabaillan is a commune in the Gers department in southwestern France.

The village is notable for the presence of several duck and geese farms specialising in the production of foie gras, one of the main products of the region.

Geography
The river Gesse forms all of the commune's southeastern border.

Population

See also
Communes of the Gers department

References

Communes of Gers